The Church of Christ is a historic church building in central Guy, Arkansas, United States, that is listed on the National Register of Historic Places.

Description

The church is located just northwest of the junction Arkansas Highway 310 and Arkansas Highway 25. It is a single story cruciform structure, built of brick and stone in the Craftsman style. It was built in 1936-37 by Silas Owens, a local master mason, and is Guy's finest stone church. It is a gabled vestibule with the entrance recessed in a round-arch opening that has been enclosed in glass. Door and window openings are quoined in light brick, contrasting with earth-toned stone of the walls.

The congregation is associated with the Churches of Christ. It was listed on the National Register of Historic Places on February 15, 2005.

See also

 National Register of Historic Places listings in Faulkner County, Arkansas

References

External links

Churches on the National Register of Historic Places in Arkansas
Churches completed in 1936
Churches in Faulkner County, Arkansas
National Register of Historic Places in Faulkner County, Arkansas